Karl Ives Berning (June 10, 1911 – September 26, 2005) was an American politician, actor, and writer.

Born in Seattle, Washington, Berning graduated from Kirkland High School in Kirkland, Washington. He received his college degree from Blackburn College and studied business administration at Lake Forest College,  Northwestern University, and University of Illinois at Chicago. Berning lived with his wife and family in Deerfield, Illinois. He wrote a book: 'The Life and Times of Karl Berning, The Early Years' and was involved with community theatre. Berning as West Deerfield Township supervisor and as township constable. He also served on the Lake County, Illinois Board of Commissioners and was chairman of the county board. Berning served as county treasurer for Lake County and was a Republican. He served in the Illinois Senate from 1967 to 1983. In 1983, Berning and his wife moved to Fort Myers, Florida. He continued to be involved with the Republican Party while living in Florida. Berning died in Naples, Florida.

Notes

External links

1911 births
2005 deaths
Politicians from Seattle
People from Deerfield, Illinois
People from Fort Myers, Florida
Blackburn College (Illinois) alumni
Lake Forest College alumni
University of Illinois Chicago
Northwestern University alumni
Male actors from Illinois
Writers from Illinois
Writers from Seattle
Florida Republicans
Illinois Republicans
County commissioners in Illinois
Illinois state senators
20th-century American politicians